The 2018 season is Felcra Football Club's 6th season in club history and 1st season in the Malaysia Premier League since being promoted to the Malaysia FAM League in 2017.

Club

Coaching staff

Kit manufacturers and financial sponsor

Player information

Full squad

Transfers

January

In

Out

Competitions

Malaysia Premier League

Malaysia FA Cup

Malaysia Cup

Squad statistics
.

References

Malaysian football clubs 2018 season
Felcra F.C.